Mathew Pritchard (born 30 March 1973) is a Welsh professional skateboarder, stunt performer, and celebrity chef. He regularly appeared as a stunt performer on Dirty Sanchez, Wrecked, and Balls of Steel. In 2019, he hosted the first BBC vegan cookery show, Dirty Vegan. He authored two cookbooks: Dirty Vegan and Dirty Vegan: Another Bite.

Career

Early career
Pritchard worked for Globe Shoes for six years and later designed his own signature shoe, a Sleep When You're Dead model named after his motto. He began skateboarding at the age of 15. His first sponsor was City Surf skate shop in Cardiff.

Dirty Sanchez and Balls of Steel
Pritchard filmed the skating video Pritchard vs Dainton, in which Pritchard and Lee Dainton skated against, hit, and pranked each other. This formed the basis of Dirty Sanchez, an MTV stunt programme starring Pritchard, Dainton, Michael "Pancho" Locke, and Dan Joyce. This ran from 2003 to 2008, and in 2006 the four released Dirty Sanchez: The Movie, in which they traveled around the globe doing stunts and pranks that related to the Seven Deadly Sins. Pritchard was also involved in multiple spin-off series. Dainton and Pritchard hosted MTV's 2007 stunt-based game show Wrecked, and Sanchez Get High was a spin-off in which Pritchard and Dainton visited indigenous peoples and took traditional medicines. It aired in 2008.

Pritchard appeared with Locke as the "Pain Men" in 10 episodes of the Channel 4 game show Balls of Steel, which ran from 2005 to 2008.

Dirty Vegan
Pritchard became vegan in 2015 after watching Cowspiracy. In 2017, he launched a YouTube-based cookery series called Proper Vegan Cookin. In 2019, he hosted Dirty Vegan, the BBC's first vegan cookery show. He also produced tie-in cookbooks for the series: Dirty Vegan and Dirty Vegan: Another Bite.

Other works
In 2018, BBC Wales filmed a documentary titled Wild Man to Ironman in which Pritchard performs a 14-day ironman challenge in Wales.

Personal life
On 7 September 2009, Pritchard was attacked with a set of keys in a supermarket in Toftwood, Norfolk, suffering serious stab wounds to his neck and chest. His assailant was jailed for five years in 2010, after being found guilty of wounding with intent to cause grievous bodily harm.

Filmography

Films

Television

Web series

Music videos

Bibliography
Dirty Vegan (2018)
Dirty Vegan: Another Bite (2019)

References

External links
 Official website
 
 Biography

1973 births
Living people
British stunt performers
British television chefs
British veganism activists
Chefs of vegan cuisine
Male chefs
People from Cardiff
Welsh television presenters
Vegan cookbook writers
Welsh chefs
Welsh male comedians
Welsh skateboarders